Tasha Aimee Williams (born 31 July 1973 in Dunedin, Otago) is a retired hammer thrower from New Zealand. Her personal best throw was 65.91 metres, achieved on 24 February 2001 in Hastings.

Biography 
Williams has represented New Zealand in rugby union, athletics, bobsleigh, weightlifting and powerlifting. At the age of 17, she featured for the Black Ferns at RugbyFest 1990 on 28 August against a Russia XV's team. She made her international rugby union debut on 2 September 1994 against Australia at Sydney.

Achievements

See also
New Zealand records in athletics

References

 
 
 Tasha Williams Black Ferns Profile

1973 births
Living people
New Zealand female hammer throwers
Athletes (track and field) at the 1998 Commonwealth Games
Athletes (track and field) at the 2002 Commonwealth Games
Athletes (track and field) at the 2000 Summer Olympics
Olympic athletes of New Zealand
Athletes from Dunedin
Commonwealth Games competitors for New Zealand
New Zealand women's international rugby union players
New Zealand female rugby union players